On 30 January 1995, TransAsia Airways Flight 510A crashed in Taiwan's Guishan district during a ferry flight.

Accident 

The aircraft, an ATR 72-200, had just dropped off passengers in Penghu for the Lunar New Year and was being ferried back to Taipei. During approach the aircraft deviated from its assigned course and crashed into a hill, killing all four crew members on board.

Investigation 
The investigation revealed that the flight crew failed to maintain situational awareness and did not cross check their navigation aids.

References 

Aviation accidents and incidents in Taiwan
Airliner accidents and incidents caused by pilot error
Accidents and incidents involving the ATR 72
Aviation accidents and incidents in 1995
Airliner accidents and incidents involving controlled flight into terrain
January 1995 events in Asia
1995 disasters in Taiwan